Branko Vukelić (1904 – January 1945) was a Yugoslav spy working for Richard Sorge's spy ring in Japan.

Birth and early life
Vukelić was born in Osijek in 1904. His Croatian Serb father Milivoj was a military officer in the Austrian army in Lika (a region in today's Croatia), and his mother Vilma was born to a Jewish parents from Osijek, Julius and Charlotta (née Weiss) Miskolczy. The Vukelić family moved to Zagreb (capital of today's Croatia) where he attended secondary school. He enrolled a college in Zagreb, but was forced to move to Paris because of his ties to Communism. Vukelić graduated Sorbonne University with a degree in law. After graduation, and because of the great global depression, he re-established contact with Communists as a way to find employment during the economic crisis.

Days in Japan

In 1933. Vukelić was sent to Japan as a Soviet counter-intelligence agent after being recruited by a Comintern member by the name of Olga. He worked along with Richard Sorge in a Soviet-backed spy network (known as Sorge ring), along with Max Clausen, Ozaki Hotsumi, and another Comintern agent, Miyagi Yotoku. Vukelić was employed by the French newspaper Havas, and Serbian daily Politika as a special correspondent.

Vukelić arrived in Yokohama, Japan on February 11, 1933, and reported to Richard Sorge, the network leader reporting to the Soviet Intelligence. Although this was a Soviet operation, Vukelić was led to believe that he was serving the Communist International.

Marriage between Branko, and his first wife, Edith dissolved in a series of affairs, and he married his Japanese language translator, Yoshiko Yamasaki. This marriage was considered a risk to the operation, and Sorge did not approve of it. Vukelić decided to get married without notifying Sorge. The ring leader sought advice from the Centre in Moscow, but the instructions were that Vukelić should stay in Japan and continue working for the network.

Vukelić's main activities in the network were primarily of gathering information. He gathered information from Japanese newspapers and magazines, as well as various embassy and journalist contacts. He was also in charge of the network's photographic work.

At one point, Vukelić was also tasked with influencing foreign journalists, mostly through Joseph Newman, New York Herald Tribune journalist, in amplifying the perceived Japanese threat to the United States on Pacific, in an attempt to alleviate Japanese pressure on Soviet's East. Vukelić's success in his task resulted in a July 1, 1939 New York Herald Tribune article titled "Japan Believed Still Aiming at South Sea Area", written by Newman.

Sorge's spy ring was eventually broken in 1941. Although Sorge tried his best to diminish Vukelić's and Miyagi's involvement, Vukelić was sentenced to life imprisonment along with Clausen. Branko was imprisoned in Sugamo, and was transferred to Abashiri Prison (Hokkaido, Japan) in July 1944. Vukelić did not survive the cold winter, and Yoshiko was informed of his death on January 15, 1945. Their son Hiroshi Yamasaki Vukelić lives in Japan and Belgrade today and works on Japanese-Serbian relations.

Soviet recognition

Although the activities of Sorge ring members, including Branko Vukelić, were not recognized until the 1960s, Vukelić was posthumously awarded the Order of the Patriotic War (First Degree) on November 5, 1964 by decree of Praesidium of the Supreme Soviet.

References

External links

 An interview with Hiroshi Yamasaki-Vukelić
 Whymant R., Sorge's Spy, on Google books
 Gannon J., Stealing Secrets, Telling Lies: How Spies and Codebreakers Helped Shape the Twentieth Century, on Google Books
 New Light on Old Spies: A Review of Recent Soviet Intelligence Revelations, CIA Library

1904 births
1945 deaths
People from Osijek
Croatian people of Serbian descent
Croatian people of Jewish descent
Austro-Hungarian Jews
Austro-Hungarian Serbs
20th-century Serbian people
Serbian people of Croatian-Jewish descent
Yugoslav people of World War II
World War II spies for the Soviet Union
Prisoners who died in Japanese detention
Spies who died in prison custody
Yugoslav people who died in prison custody
People convicted of spying for the Soviet Union
Japan–Yugoslavia relations